Messidor was the tenth month in the French Republican Calendar. The month was named after the Latin word , which means harvest.

Messidor was the first month of the summer quarter. It started on 19 or 20 June. It ended on 18 or 19 July. It follows the Prairial and precedes the Thermidor.

Day name table 
Like all FRC months Messidor lasted 30 days and was divided into three 10-day weeks called décades (decades). Every day had the name of an agricultural plant, except the 5th (Quintidi) and 10th day (Decadi) of every decade, which had the name of a domestic animal (Quintidi) or an agricultural tool (Decadi).

Conversion table

External links 
Summer Quarter of Year II (facsimile)

French Republican calendar
June
July

sv:Franska revolutionskalendern#Månaderna